Matthew Taljard (born 8 September 1985) is a South African rugby union player, currently playing with Romanian SuperLiga side Farul Constanţa. His regular position is hooker.

Career

He joined Romanian SuperLiga side Farul Constanţa in 2013.

Personal
He's the older brother of rugby player Jeff Taljard.

References

1985 births
Living people
Border Bulldogs players
Rugby union players from East London, Eastern Cape
South African rugby union players
Rugby union hookers